The 2000 Merdeka Tournament was the 36th incidence of the Merdeka Tournament and was held 13 to 19 August 2000.

Groups

Group stage

Single Group Stage

Finals

Award

External links
 2000 Merdeka Tournament at RSSF.com website

2000
2000 in Asian football
2000 in New Zealand association football
2000 in Malaysian football
2000–01 in Omani football
Mer